Loeper is a surname of German origin. Notable people with the surname include:

F. Joseph Loeper (born 1944), American politician
Wilhelm Loeper (footballer) (born 1998), Swedish footballer 
Wilhelm Friedrich Loeper (1883–1935), German politician

References

Surnames of German origin